The fourth and final season of the American television series Atlanta premiered on FX on September 15, 2022. The season is produced by RBA, 343 Incorporated, MGMT. Entertainment, and FXP, with Donald Glover, Paul Simms, Dianne McGunigle, Stephen Glover, Hiro Murai, and Stefani Robinson serving as executive producers. Donald Glover serves as creator and showrunner.

The season was ordered in August 2019, which would later be revealed to be the final season in February 2022. It stars Donald Glover, Brian Tyree Henry, LaKeith Stanfield, and Zazie Beetz. The series follows Earn during his daily life in Atlanta, Georgia, as he tries to redeem himself in the eyes of his ex-girlfriend Van, who is also the mother of his daughter Lottie; as well as his parents and his cousin Alfred, who raps under the stage name "Paper Boi"; and Darius, Alfred's eccentric right-hand man. After having the characters stay in Europe in the previous season, the season follows the characters as they return to Atlanta.

The season has been universally acclaimed for its acting, writing, directing, cinematography, and tension; with some declaring it a return to form from the previous season.

Cast and characters

Main
 Donald Glover as Earnest "Earn" Marks / Kirkwood Chocolate
 Brian Tyree Henry as Alfred "Paper Boi" Miles
 LaKeith Stanfield as Darius
 Zazie Beetz as Vanessa "Van" Keefer

Recurring
 Austin Elle Fisher as Lottie Marks

Guest
 Khris Davis as Tracy
 Katt Williams as Willie
 Isiah Whitlock Jr. as Raleigh Marks
 Soulja Boy as himself
 Brian McKnight as himself
 Sinbad as himself
 Jenna Wortham as themself
 Cree Summer as herself

Episodes

Production

Development
The series was renewed for a fourth season in August 2019, even before the third season started filming. FX President Eric Schrier commented, "What more can be said about Atlanta than the critical acclaim and accolades that Donald, Paul Simms, Dianne McGunigle, Stephen Glover and Hiro Murai have earned for two exceptional seasons of what is clearly one of the best shows on television. This group of collaborators and cast have created one of the most original, innovative stories of this generation and we are proud to be their partners."

In February 2022, FX confirmed that the series would end with the fourth season. Glover considered ending the series with the second season, but he chose to end the series with the fourth season as "Death is natural. I feel like when the conditions are right for something, they happen, and when the conditions aren't right, they don't happen. I don't feel any longevity. Because then things start to get weird. The story was always supposed to be what it was. And the story, it really was us. Everybody in that writers' room, everybody on set. It really was what we were going through and what we talked about." He further added, "It was great, all of that came out this season and it ends perfectly." Despite that, Glover also suggested that he could revisit the series, saying "If there's a reason to do it, of course. Like a Christmas special. It always depends. I like keeping my options open."

Writing
Executive producer Hiro Murai described, "we're back in Atlanta again and it was kind of a homecoming season and it was really lovely. We got to say goodbye properly to the city and the show, I think it'll feel a little nostalgic too because I don't think you've seen Atlanta during the summer since season one. It's kind of like the greatest hits season."

After the polarizing reception to the anthology episodes from the previous season, Glover commented, "'We know you hated them. It's fine. I'm really proud of those episodes" while Stephen Glover said, "Those episodes felt, for a lot of people, out of the way we do things. But for me, it's kind of like we've always done stuff like that. In Season 4, I think there's some elements of and pieces of that... that maybe people won't hate as much this time?"

Filming
In August 2019, FX confirmed that the season would start filming in spring 2020, filming back-to-back with the third season. However, production was shut down amidst the COVID-19 pandemic. Production would resume in summer 2021, after filming part of the third season in Europe. In August 2021, FX confirmed that the season was already in production. By February 2022, FX confirmed that filming for the season and the series had wrapped.

Release

Broadcast
In January 2020, Chairman of FX, John Landgraf said that the season would air in fall 2021, with the third season airing at the beginning of the year. However, due to production pausing due to the COVID-19 pandemic, Landgraf said the seasons would not be ready for their intended 2021 premiere dates, later signaling that the seasons would premiere in 2022. In December 2021, FX stated that the season would premiere in fall 2022. In August 2022, it was confirmed that the season would premiere on September 15, 2022, with the first two episodes.

Marketing
In August 2022, a trailer for the season was released.

Reception

Critical reception
Based upon the first three episodes given to critics, the fourth season has received critical acclaim, with many considering it an improvement over season three. The season has a score of 82 out of 100 on Metacritic, based on 10 critics, indicating "universal acclaim". On Rotten Tomatoes, it has an approval rating of 96% based on 98 reviews, with the website's critical consensus reading, "Foregrounding its characters and namesake again after an anthological sojourn in Europe, Atlanta closes out in its sweet spot: funny, insightful, and weird as hell."

References

External links 
 
 

Atlanta (TV series)
2022 American television seasons